Mark Arceri (born 25 October 1964) is a former Italian-Australian rules footballer who played with North Melbourne, Carlton and
St Kilda in the AFL. A rover, he made the final shortlist of 50 for the VFL/AFL Italian Team of the Century. He is dubiously remembered as the player who, with 33 seconds remaining, kicked Carlton's only goal in their Round 11, 1991 loss to Footscray at the Western Oval; it would be another fifteen years until another player became his team's sole goal-scorer.

External links

1964 births
Living people
Australian rules footballers from Victoria (Australia)
Australian people of Italian descent
North Melbourne Football Club players
Carlton Football Club players
St Kilda Football Club players
Williamstown Football Club players
Victorian State of Origin players